The VIII International Chopin Piano Competition was held from 6 to 25 October 1970 in Warsaw. The competition was won by Garrick Ohlsson of the United States, becoming the first and so far only American winner.

This was the first competition that was held in October; previous competitions had been held in February.

Awards 
The competition consisted of two elimination stages and a final with twelve pianists.

The following prizes were awarded:

Two special prizes were awarded:

Jury 
The jury consisted of:
  Raif J. Abillama
  Guido Agosti (vice-chairman)
  
  Jan Ekier
  Monique Haas
  
  Jan Hoffman
  Witold Małcużyński
  
  Tatiana Nikolayeva (vice-chairman)
  Stepanka Pelischek
  Éliane Richepin
  
  Annerose Schmidt
  Kazimierz Sikorski (chairman)
  Regina Smendzianka
  Pavel Štěpán
   (secretary)
  Bolesław Woytowicz

Leon Fleisher (USA) resigned just before the competition due to an illness.

References

Further reading

External links 
 

 

International Chopin Piano Competition
1970 in music
1970 in Poland
1970s in Warsaw
October 1970 events in Europe